The Diocese of Zealand (Danish: Sjællands Stift) was a protestant diocese in Denmark that existed from 1537 to 1922. The diocese had been formed in 1537 following the  Reformation of Denmark, and was dissolved in 1922 when it was divided into the Diocese of Copenhagen and the Diocese of Roskilde. While it existed, the diocese functioned as the head of the Church of Denmark, beneath the crown, and its bishop was regarded as Primus inter pares.

History
The Diocese of Zealand was established in 1537 following the Reformation. During the Reformation, the former Catholic bishops in Denmark—who had led the country's dioceses—were removed from their positions and their property was confiscated by the Crown. From that point onward the monarch of Denmark functioned as the head of the newly formed Church of Denmark. At the onset of the church, bishops were officially styled as superintendents, to reflect their diminished authority beneath the crown, though this proved temporary. The title of archbishop was also abolished with the reformation, though the Bishop of Zealand was considered primus inter pares, and regarded as the head of the church beneath the authority of the crown.

The diocese of Zealand replaced the Catholic Diocese of Roskilde, though it maintained much of its infrastructure. The Roskilde Cathedral remained the diocese's central cathedral and the official residence of the bishop remained in Copenhagen, as had been the case for his Catholic predecessors, although it moved to the former city hall, now known as Bispegården, which translates literally to the Bishop's House. 

Apart from the island of Zealand, from which the diocese took its name, the diocese covered Møn, Amager and various smaller islands in the area. Various dependencies and distant islands also fell under the diocese's jurisdiction, including  the Faroe Islands, the Danish colonies in Greenland, and other overseas territories. The island of Bornholm was included in 1662, following the 1660 Treaty of Copenhagen which ceded the rest of the Diocese of Lund to Sweden.

In 1922, the diocese was divided into the Diocese of Copenhagen and the Diocese of Roskilde. Harald Ostenfeld, the last Bishop of Zealand, continued as the Bishop of Copenhagen while Henry Fonnesbech-Wulff became the Bishop of Roskilde.

Bishops of Zealand
1537–1560 Peder Palladius
1560–1569 Hans Albertsen
1569–1590 Poul Madsen
1590–1614 Peder Jensen Vinstrup, not to be confused with his son Peder Pedersen Winstrup (1605–1679)
1614–1638 Hans Poulsen Resen
1638–1652 Jesper Rasmussen Brochmand
1652–1653 Hans Hansen Resen
1653–1655 Laurids Mortensen Scavenius
1655–1668 Hans Svane (titular Archbishop)
1668–1675 Hans Wandal
1675–1693 Hans Bagger
1693–1710 Henrik Bornemann
1710–1737 Christen Worm
1737–1757 Peder Hersleb 
1757–1783 Ludvig Harboe (Hersleb's son-in-law)
1783–1808 Nicolai Edinger Balle (Harboe's son-in-law)
1808–1830 Friedrich Christian Carl Hinrich Münter
1830–1834 Peter Erasmus Müller
1834–1854 Jacob Peter Mynster
1854–1884 Hans Lassen Martensen
1884–1895 Bruun Juul Fog
1895–1909 Thomas Skat Rørdam
1909–1911 Peder Madsen 
1911–1922 Harald Ostenfeld

List of prefects (Stiftamtmænd)
1660–1661 Ove Skade
1662–1682 Johan Christopher Körbitz
1682–1717 Otto Krabbe
1717–1721 Frederik Christian von Adeler
1721–1729 Rudolph von Gersdorff
1729–1730 Christian Frederik Holstein
1730–1735 Johan Ludvig Holstein
1735–1748 Niels Gersdorff
1749–1750 Conrad Ditlev Reventlow
1750–1750 Adolph Andreas von der Lühe
1750–1764 Holger Skeel
1764–1776 Eggert Christoffer Knuth
1776–1787 Henrik Adam Brockenhuus
1787–1790 Gregers Christian Haxthausen
1790–1802 Johan Heinrich Knuth
1802–1810 Frederik Hauch
1810–1816 Werner Jasper Andreas Moltke
1816–1821 Christopher Schøller Bülow
1821–1831 Frederik von Lowzow
1831–1850 Julius Knuth
1850–1859 Peter Tetens
1859–1872 Carl Simony
1873–1889 Johan Christian Bille-Brahe
1889–1909 Christian Bache
1909–1911 Frederik de Jonquières
1911–1915 Anders Dybdal
1915–1922 Emil Ammentorp (Continued in the Dioceses of Copenhagen and Roskilde)

See also
Church of Denmark
Diocese of Copenhagen

References

Church of Denmark dioceses
Diocese of Zealand
1537 establishments in Denmark
1922 disestablishments in Denmark